

Events
Below, the events of World War II have the "WWII" prefix.

January

 January 2 – WWII:
 Free French General Jean de Lattre de Tassigny is appointed to command French Army B, part of the Sixth United States Army Group in North Africa.
 Landing at Saidor: 13,000 US and Australian troops land on Papua New Guinea, in an attempt to cut off a Japanese retreat.
 January 8 – WWII: Philippine Commonwealth troops enter the province of Ilocos Sur in northern Luzon and attack Japanese forces.
 January 11
 President of the United States Franklin D. Roosevelt proposes a Second Bill of Rights for social and economic security, in his State of the Union address.
 The Nazi German administration expands Kraków-Płaszów concentration camp into the larger standalone Konzentrationslager Plaszow bei Krakau in occupied Poland.
 January 12 – WWII: Winston Churchill and Charles de Gaulle begin a 2-day conference in Marrakech.
 January 14 – WWII: Soviet troops start the offensive at Leningrad and Novgorod.
 January 15
 WWII: The 27th Polish Home Army Infantry Division is re-created, marking the start of Operation Tempest by the Polish Home Army, a resistance force.
 1944 San Juan earthquake: An earthquake hits San Juan, Argentina, killing an estimated 10,000 people, in the worst natural disaster in Argentina's history.
 January 17 – WWII:
 The Battle of Monte Cassino begins in Italy. British forces cross the Garigliano River. U.S. Fifth Army troops, commanded by Lieutenant-General Mark W. Clark, arrive at the Garigliano, to begin their attack against the Gustav Line south of Rome. The French Expeditionary Corps, under command of General Alphonse Juin, moves into the mountains north of Monte Cassino.
 The Soviet Union ceases production of the Mosin–Nagant 1891/30 sniper rifle.
 January 20 – WWII:
 The Royal Air Force drops 2,300 tons of bombs on Berlin.
 The United States 36th Infantry Division in Italy attempts to cross the Rapido River.
 January 22 – WWII: Operation Shingle: The Allies begin the assault on Anzio, Italy. The U.S. 45th Infantry Division stand their ground at Anzio against violent assaults for four months.
 January 25 – A total solar eclipse is visible in Pacific Ocean, South America, Atlantic Ocean and Africa, the 48th solar eclipse of Solar Saros 130.
 January 27 – WWII:
 The two-year Siege of Leningrad is lifted.
 Light cruiser  is sunk by a Henschel Hs 293 guided missile, from a German aircraft off Anzio, western Italy, with the loss of 46 men.
 January 29 – WWII: Koniuchy massacre – A unit of Soviet partisans accompanied by Jewish partisans kills at least 38 civilians in the village of Koniuchy in Nazi occupied Lithuania.
 January 30 – WWII:
 The Battle of Cisterna opens, as United States Army Rangers attempt to break out of the Anzio beachhead.
 United States troops invade Majuro, Marshall Islands.
 January 31 – WWII: Battle of Kwajalein: American forces land on Kwajalein Atoll and other islands, in the Japanese-held Marshall Islands.

February

 The Zadran tribe rises up against the Afghan government, starting the Afghan tribal revolts of 1944–1947.
 February 2 – The first issue of Human Events is published in Washington, D.C.
 February 3 – WWII: United States troops capture the Marshall Islands.
 February 7 – WWII: At Anzio, German forces launch a counteroffensive.
 February 8 – WWII:
 2,765 drown when American submarine  torpedoes Japanese troop transport Lima Maru.
 2,670 drown when British submarine  torpedoes German-captured  carrying Italian prisoners of war.
 February 14 – WWII: An anti-Japanese revolt breaks out on Java.
 February 15 – WWII: Battle of Monte Cassino – The monastery atop Monte Cassino is destroyed by Allied bombing.
 February 17 – WWII: Pacific War – The Battle of Eniwetok begins when U.S. forces invade the atoll in the Marshall Islands.
 February 18 – WWII: British light cruiser  is torpedoed and sunk by U-410 in the Mediterranean; 417 of her crew, including the captain, go down with the ship; 206 survive.
 February 20 – WWII:
 The "Big Week" begins, with American bomber raids on German aircraft manufacturing centers.
 The United States takes Eniwetok Atoll.
 Norwegian heavy water sabotage: The Norwegian resistance sinks train ferry SF Hydro which is carrying a shipment of heavy water from the Vemork plant to Germany along Tinnsjå in Telemark.
 February 22 – WWII: The United States Strategic Air Forces in Europe is organized from the Eighth Air Force's strategic planning staff, subsuming strategic planning for all US Army Air Forces in Europe and Africa.
 February 23 – WWII:
 Deportation of the Chechens and Ingush ("Operation Lentil"): Forced deportation of Chechens and Ingush people from North Caucasus to Kazakhstan and Kyrgyzstan in Central Asia by the Soviet authorities begins.
 The Battle of Eniwetok concludes when U.S. forces secure the last islands in the Eniwetok Atoll.
 February 26
 Kurt Gerron begins shooting the Nazi propaganda film Theresienstadt in Theresienstadt concentration camp. He and many others who are featured in it are transferred to Auschwitz and gassed upon the film's completion.
 Sue S. Dauser becomes the first woman appointed to the substantive rank of captain, in the United States Navy Nurse Corps.
 February 29 – WWII: Pacific War – The Admiralty Islands campaign (Operation Brewer) opens when U.S. forces land on Los Negros Island in the Admiralty Islands.

March

 March – Austrian-born economist Friedrich Hayek publishes his book The Road to Serfdom in London.
 March 1 – WWII: American submarine  torpedoes Japanese merchant cruiser ; 2,495 drown.
 March 2 – The 16th Academy Awards Ceremony is held, the first Oscar ceremony held at a large public venue, Grauman's Chinese Theatre in Hollywood. Casablanca, directed by Michael Curtiz, wins the Award for Best Picture.
 March 3 – WWII: The Order of Nakhimov and the Order of Ushakov are instituted in the USSR.
 March 4 – Louis Buchalter, the leader of 1930s crime syndicate Murder, Inc., is executed at Sing Sing, in Ossining, New York, along with Emanuel Weiss and Louis Capone.
 March 6 – WWII: Soviet Army planes attack Narva, Estonia, destroying almost the entire baroque old town.
 March 9 – WWII: Soviet Army planes attack Tallinn, Estonia, killing 757 and leaving 25,000 homeless.
 March 10
 In Britain, the prohibition on married women working as teachers is lifted.
 Resistance leader Joop Westerweel is arrested while returning to the Netherlands, having escorted a group of Jewish children to safety in Spain.
 March 12 – WWII: The Political Committee of National Liberation is created in Greece.
 March 15
 WWII: Battle of Monte Cassino: Allied aircraft bomb the monastery, and an assault is staged.
 WWII: The National Council of the French Resistance approves the Resistance programme.
 The Soviet Union introduces a new anthem, replacing The Internationale.
 March 18
The last eruption of Mount Vesuvius in Italy kills 26, and causes thousands to flee their homes.
WWII: The Nazis execute almost 400 prisoners, Soviet citizens and anti-fascist Romanians at Rîbnița.
 March 19 
 WWII: Operation Margarethe: German forces occupy Hungary.
 The secular oratorio A Child of Our Time by Michael Tippett is premiered at the Adelphi Theatre in London.
 March 20 - WWII:
 Landing on Emirau: 4,000 United States Marines land on Emirau Island in the Bismarck Archipelago to develop an airbase, as part of Operation Cartwheel.
Tree branches interrupt his fall and he lands safely on deep snow.
 March 23 – WWII: Members of the Italian Resistance attack Nazis marching in Via Rasella, killing 33.
 March 24 – WWII:
 Ardeatine massacre: In Rome, 335 Italians are killed, including 75 Jews and over 200 members of the Italian Resistance from various groups.
 In Markowa, Poland, German police kill Józef and Wiktoria Ulm, their 6 children and 8 Jews they were hiding.
 The "Great Escape": 76 Royal Air Force prisoners of war escape by tunnel "Harry" from Stalag Luft III this night. Only 3 men (2 Norwegians and a Dutchman) return to the UK; of those recaptured, 50 are summarily executed soon afterwards, in the Stalag Luft III murders.
 March 27 – In Sweden, Ruben Rausing patents Erik Wallenberg's method of packaging milk in paper, origin of the international company Tetra Pak.

April

April 2 – WWII: Ascq massacre: Members of the 12th SS Panzer Division Hitlerjugend shoot 85 civilians suspected of blowing up their train on its approach to the Gare d'Ascq in France.
April 4 WWII:
Allied bombardment of Bucharest, Romania begins. The United States Air Force and British Royal Air Force, with approximately 3,640 bombers of different types, accompanied by about 1,830 fighters bomb Romania for the following 4½ months. As collateral damage, 5,524 inhabitants are killed, 3,373 injured, and 47,974 left homeless.
An Allied photoreconnaissance aircraft of 60 Squadron SAAF photographs part of Auschwitz concentration camp.
April 10 – The Holocaust: Rudolf Vrba and Alfréd Wetzler escape from Auschwitz concentration camp; on April 25–27 they prepare the Vrba–Wetzler report, one of the earliest and most detailed descriptions of the extermination of Jews in the camp.
April 14 – Bombay Explosion: Freighter SS Fort Stikine, carrying a mixed cargo of ammunition, cotton bales and gold, explodes in harbour at Bombay (India), sinking surrounding ships and killing around 800 people.
April 15 – Italian fascist philosopher Giovanni Gentile is assassinated in Florence by Bruno Fanciullacci, a member of the partisan Gruppi di Azione Patriottica.
April 16 – WWII: Allied forces start bombing Belgrade, killing about 1,100 people. This bombing falls on the Orthodox Christian Easter.
April 19 – WWII:
 The Japanese launch the Operation Ichi-Go offensive in central and south China.
 Semaine rouge: American and British planes bomb the city of Rouen.
April 25
 The Holocaust: SS-Obersturmbannführer Adolf Eichmann opens "blood for goods" negotiations with Joel Brand, to offer the release of thousands of Jews from eastern Europe to the Hungarian Aid and Rescue Committee, in exchange for supplies for the German Eastern Front.
 The United Negro College Fund is incorporated in the United States.
April 26 – WWII:
German General Kreipe is kidnapped on Crete, Greece.
 American submarine  torpedoes Japanese cargo carrier ; 2,649 drown.
April 28 – WWII: Allied convoy T4, forming part of amphibious Exercise Tiger (a full-scale rehearsal for the Normandy landings) in Start Bay, off the Devon coast of England, is attacked by E-boats, resulting in the deaths of 749 American servicemen from LSTs.

May

 May – Jean-Paul Sartre's existentialist drama No Exit (Huis Clos) premières in Nazi-occupied Paris.
 May 1 – WWII: Two hundred Communist prisoners are shot by the Germans at Kaisariani, Athens, Greece, in reprisal for the killing of General Franz Krech by Partisans at Molaoi.
 May 5 – WWII: Mohandas Gandhi is released from jail in India, on health grounds.
 May 9 – WWII: In the Ukrainian city of Sevastopol, Soviet troops completely drive out German forces, who had been ordered by Hitler to “fight to the last man.”
 May 12 – WWII: Soviet troops finalize the liberation of the Crimea.
 May 14 – The Holocaust: Predominantly Muslim Albanian troops of the 21st Waffen Mountain Division of the SS Skanderbeg (1st Albanian) round up 281 Jews in Pristina, and hand them over to the Germans for transportation to Bergen-Belsen concentration camp.
 May 15–July 8 – The Holocaust: Hungarian Jews are deported to Auschwitz and other Nazi concentration camps.
 May 18 – WWII:
 Battle of Monte Cassino: The Germans evacuate Monte Cassino and Allied forces, led by Władysław Anders from Polish II Corps, take the stronghold after a struggle that has claimed 20,000 lives.
 Crimean Tatars are deported by the Soviet Union.
 May 24 – WWII: West Loch disaster: Six LSTs are accidentally destroyed and 163 men killed, in Pearl Harbor.
 May 30 – Princess Charlotte Louise Juliette Louvet Grimaldi of Monaco, heir to the throne, resigns in favor of her son Prince Rainier Louis Henri Maxence Bertrand Grimaldi, who later reigns as Prince Rainier III of Monaco.
 May 31 – WWII: American destroyer escort  sinks the sixth Japanese submarine in two weeks. This anti-submarine warfare performance remains unmatched through the 20th century.

June

 June 1 – Two K-class blimps of the United States Navy complete the first transatlantic crossing by non-rigid airships, from the U.S. to French Morocco, with two stops.
 June 2 – WWII: The Provisional Government of the French Republic is established.
 June 3 – Hans Asperger publishes his paper on Asperger syndrome.
 June 4 – WWII:
 Rome falls to the Allies, the first Axis capital to fall.
Some significant intelligence data is acquired.
 June 5 – WWII:
 The German navy's Enigma messages are decoded in England almost in real time.
 British Group Captain James Stagg correctly forecasts a brief improvement in weather conditions over the English Channel, which will permit the following day's Normandy landings to take place (having been deferred from today due to unfavourable weather).
 At 10:15 p.m. local time, the BBC transmits coded messages including the second line of the Paul Verlaine poem "Chanson d'automne" to the French Resistance, indicating that the invasion of Europe is about to begin.
 More than 1,000 British bombers drop 5,000 tons of bombs on German gun batteries on the Normandy coast, in preparation for D-Day.
 US and British airborne divisions drop into Normandy, in preparation for D-Day.
 D-Day naval deceptions are launched.
 June 6 – WWII: D-Day: 155,000 Allied troops shipped from England land on the beaches of Normandy in northern France, beginning Operation Overlord and the Invasion of Normandy. The Allied soldiers quickly break through the Atlantic Wall and push inland, in the largest amphibious military operation in history. This operation helps liberate France from Germany, and also weakens the Nazi hold on Europe.
 June 7 – WWII:
 Bayeux is liberated by British troops.
 Operation Perch, a British attempt to capture Caen from the Germans, commences; it is abandoned on June 14.
 The steamer Danae, carrying 600 Cretans (including 350 Greek Jews) on the first leg of the journey to Auschwitz, is sunk, with no known survivors, off Santorini.
 Joel Brand is intercepted by British agents in Aleppo.
 June 9 – WWII: Soviet leader Joseph Stalin launches the Vyborg–Petrozavodsk Offensive against Finland, with the intent of defeating Finland before pushing for Berlin.
 June 10 – WWII: Oradour-sur-Glane massacre: 642 men, women and children are killed in France.
 June 13 – WWII: Germany launches the first V-1 flying bomb attack on London.
 June 15 – WWII: Battle of Saipan: United States forces land on Saipan.
 June 15–16 – WWII: Bombing of Yawata – The United States Army Air Forces conduct the first air raid on the Japanese home islands.
 June 16 – At age 14, George Stinney becomes the youngest person ever executed in the United States.
 June 17 – Iceland declares full independence from Denmark.
 June 19 – WWII: A severe storm badly damages the Mulberry harbours on the Normandy coast.
 June 20 – WWII: A V-2 rocket becomes the first man-made object to cross the Kármán line and reach the edge of space.
 June 22 – WWII:
 Operation Bagration: A general attack by Soviet forces clears the German forces from Belarus, resulting in the destruction of German Army Group Centre, possibly the greatest defeat of the Wehrmacht during WWII.
 Burma Campaign: The Battle of Kohima ends in a British victory.
 June 23 – The Holocaust: Maurice Rossel of the International Committee of the Red Cross visits Theresienstadt concentration camp, uncritically accepting the propaganda view of it presented by the Schutzstaffel.
 June 25 – WWII:
 Battle of Tali-Ihantala (the largest battle ever in the Nordic countries): Finland is able to resist the Soviet attack, and thus manages to remain an independent nation.
 Cherbourg is bombarded by ships of the United States Navy and British Royal Navy, in support of U.S. ground troops.
 June 26 – WWII: American troops enter Cherbourg.
 June 29 – WWII: American submarine  torpedoes Japanese troop transport ; 5,400 drown.
 June 30 – WWII: American submarine  torpedoes Japanese troop transport ; 3,219 drown.

July

 July–October – WWII: Germans are driven out of Lithuania leading to reimposition of the Lithuanian Soviet Socialist Republic.
 July 1 – The United Nations Monetary and Financial Conference begins at Bretton Woods, New Hampshire, United States.
 July 3 – WWII:
 Soviet troops liberate Minsk.
 Battle of Imphal: Japanese forces call off their advance, ending the battle with a British victory.
 July 6 – WWII: At Camp Hood, Texas, future baseball star and 1st Lt. Jackie Robinson is arrested and later court-martialed, for refusing to move to the back of a segregated U.S. Army bus (he is eventually acquitted).
 July 9 – WWII: British and Canadian forces capture Caen.
 July 10–11 – WWII: Operation Jupiter during the Battle of Normandy of World War II: British strategic victory over German Panzer Corps.
 July 10 – WWII: Soviet troops begin operations to liberate the Baltic countries from Nazi occupation.
 July 12–21 – WWII: Dortan massacre – 35–36 French civilians are killed by Ostlegionen (Cossacks) serving with the Wehrmacht.
 July 13 – WWII: Vilnius is freed by Soviet forces.
 July 16 – WWII: The first contingent of the Brazilian Expeditionary Force arrives in Italy.
 July 17 – WWII:
 The largest convoy of the war embarks from Halifax Harbour, Nova Scotia, under Royal Canadian Navy protection.
 Port Chicago disaster: The SS E. A. Bryan, loaded with ammunition, explodes at the Port Chicago, California, Naval Magazine, killing 320 sailors and civilian personnel.
 July 18 – WWII:
 American forces push back the Germans in Saint-Lô, capturing the city.
 British forces launch Operation Goodwood, an armoured offensive aimed at driving the Germans from the high ground to the south of Caen. The offensive ends 2 days later with minimal gains.
 Hideki Tōjō resigns as Prime Minister of Japan due to numerous setbacks in the war effort and is succeeded on July 22 by Kuniaki Koiso.
 July 20
 WWII: Adolf Hitler survives the 20 July plot to assassinate him led by Claus von Stauffenberg; he and his fellow conspirators in this and Operation Valkyrie are executed the following day.
 The annular solar eclipse of July 20, 1944 is visible in Africa, Indian Ocean, Asia, Pacific Ocean and Australia, and is the 35th solar eclipse of Solar Saros 135.
 July 21 – WWII:
 Battle of Guam: American troops land on Guam (the battle ends August 10).
 The Soviet-sponsored Polish Committee of National Liberation is created, in opposition to the Polish government-in-exile.
 July 22
The Bretton Woods Conference ends with agreements signed to set up the International Bank for Reconstruction and Development, General Agreement on Tariffs and Trade and International Monetary Fund.
The new Polish Committee of National Liberation publishes the PKWN Manifesto in Chełm, calling for a continuation of fighting against Nazi Germany, radical reforms including nationalisation of industry, and a "decent border in the West" (the Oder–Neisse line).
United States v. Masaaki Kuwabara, the only Japanese American draft avoidance case to be dismissed on a due process violation of the U.S. Constitution.
 July 24 – The Holocaust: Majdanek concentration camp is liberated by the Soviet Red Army and much incriminating evidence of the atrocities committed there is found.
 July 25 – WWII:
Operation Spring: One of the bloodiest days for Canadian forces during the war results in 1,550 casualties, including 450 killed, during the Normandy Campaign.
Battle of Tannenberg Line (or "Battle of the Blue Hills") in northeastern Estonia begins: The Red Army will gain a Pyrrhic victory by August 10.
 July 26 – WWII: A Messerschmitt Me 262 becomes the first jet fighter aircraft to have an operational victory.
 July 31 – WWII: American submarine  torpedoes Japanese troop transport Yoshino Maru; 2,495 drown.

August

 
 August 1 – WWII: The Warsaw Uprising begins.
 August 2 – WWII:
 Turkey ends diplomatic and economic relations with Germany.
 The First Assembly of ASNOM (the Anti-Fascist Assembly for the People's Liberation of Macedonia) is held in the Prohor Pčinjski monastery.
 August 3 – The Education Act in the United Kingdom, promoted by Rab Butler, creates a Tripartite system of education in England, Wales and Northern Ireland.
 August 4 – WWII:
 The Holocaust: A tip from a Dutch informer leads the Gestapo to a sealed-off area in an Amsterdam warehouse, where they find Jewish diarist Anne Frank, her family, and others in hiding. All will die in captivity, except for Otto Frank, Anne's father.
 The Finnish Parliament, by derogation, elects Marshal C. G. E. Mannerheim as President of Finland to replace Risto Ryti, who has resigned.
 August 5 – WWII:
 The Warsaw Uprising:
 The Wola massacre begins. Between now and August 12, 40,000 to 50,000 Polish civilians will be indiscriminately massacred by occupying SS troops.
 The Holocaust: Polish insurgents liberate a German labor camp in Warsaw, freeing 348 Jewish prisoners.
 Cowra breakout: Over 500 Japanese prisoners of war attempt a mass breakout from the Cowra camp in Australia. In the ensuing manhunt, 231 Japanese escapees and four Australian soldiers are killed.
 August 7 – IBM dedicates the first program-controlled calculator, the Automatic Sequence Controlled Calculator (known best as the Harvard Mark I).
 August 9 – The United States Forest Service and the Wartime Advertising Council release the first posters featuring Smokey Bear.
 August 12 – WWII:
 The Allies capture Florence, Italy.
 Operation Pluto: The world's first undersea oil pipeline is laid between England and France.
 August 15 – WWII: Operation Dragoon lands Allies in southern France. The U.S. 45th Infantry Division participates in its fourth assault landing at Sainte-Maxime, spearheading the drive for the Belfort Gap.
 August 18 – WWII: American submarine  sinks Teia Maru, Eishin Maru, Teiyu Maru, and aircraft carrier  from Japanese convoy HI71, in one of the most effective American "wolfpack" attacks of the war.
 August 19 – WWII:
 American submarine  torpedoes Japanese landing craft depot ship ; more than 4,400 Japanese servicemen drown.
 Liberation of Paris starts with resistance forces staging an insurrection against the German occupiers.
 August 20 – WWII:
 American forces successfully defeat Nazi forces at Chambois, closing the Falaise Pocket.
 168 captured Allied airmen, including Phil Lamason, accused of being "terror fliers" by the Gestapo, arrive at Buchenwald concentration camp, where they form the KLB Club.
 August 21
 The Dumbarton Oaks Conference (Washington Conversations on International Peace and Security Organization) opens in Washington, D.C.: U.S., British, Chinese, French and Soviet representatives meet to plan the foundation of the United Nations.
 WWII: Operation Tractable concludes, when Canadian troops relieve the Polish and link with the Americans, capturing remaining German forces in the Falaise Pocket, and securing the strategically important French town of Falaise, in the final offensive of the Battle of Normandy.
 August 22 – WWII:
 Holocaust of Kedros: German Wehrmacht infantry begin an intimidatory razing operation, killing 164, against the civilian residents of nine villages in the Amari Valley on the occupied Greek island of Crete.
 August 23 – WWII:
 King Michael's Coup: Ion Antonescu, Conducator of Romania, and Mihai Antonescu, prime minister of Romania, are arrested and a new military government established. Romania leaves the war against the Soviet Union, joining the Allies. General Constantin Sanatescu is the "armed force" of the coup d'état and will be appointed by King Michael of Romania as prime minister of Romania on September 1.
 Padule di Fucecchio massacre: At least 174 Italian civilians are killed by members of the 23rd Infantry Division (Wehrmacht) as a reprisal for the wounding of two soldiers.
 August 24 – WWII:
 Liberation of Paris: The Allies enter Paris, successfully completing Operation Overlord.
 August 25 – WWII:
 German surrender of Paris: General Dietrich von Choltitz surrenders Paris to the Allies, in defiance of Hitler's orders to destroy it.
 Maillé massacre: 129 civilians (70% women and children) are massacred by the Gestapo at Maillé, Indre-et-Loire.
 Hungary decides to continue the war together with Germany.
 The Red Ball Express convoy system begins operation, supplying tons of materiel to Allied forces in France.
 August 29 – WWII: The Slovak National Uprising against the Axis powers begins.
 August 31 – The Mad Gasser of Mattoon apparently resumes his mysterious attacks in Mattoon, Illinois for two weeks.

September

 September – The Dutch famine ("Hongerwinter") begins, in the occupied northern part of the Netherlands.
 September 1 – WWII: In Bulgaria, the Bagryanov government resigns.
 September 2
 The Holocaust: Diarist Anne Frank and her family are placed on the last transport train from Westerbork to Auschwitz concentration camp, arriving 3 days later.
 ¡Hola! magazine is launched in Barcelona.
 The last execution of a Finn in Finland will take place when soldier Olavi Laiho is executed by shooting in Oulu.
 September 3 – WWII: The Allies liberate Brussels.
 September 4 – WWII:
 The British 11th Armoured Division liberates the city of Antwerp, Belgium.
 Finland breaks off relations with Germany.
 September 5
 WWII: The Soviet Union declares war on Bulgaria.
 Belgium, Netherlands and Luxembourg constitute Benelux.
 September 6 – WWII: The Tartu Offensive in Estonia concludes, with Soviet forces capturing Tartu.
 September 7 – WWII:
 The Belgian government in exile returns to Brussels from London.
 Members of Vichy France's collaborationist government are relocated to Germany where an enclave is established for them in Sigmaringen Castle.
 Shin'yō Maru incident: Japanese cargo ship  is torpedoed and sunk in the Sulu Sea by American submarine USS Paddle while carrying 750 American prisoners of war; 688 perish.
 September 8 – WWII:
 The first V-2 rocket attack on London takes place.
 The French town of Menton is liberated from German forces.
 Bulgaria declares war on Germany.
 September 9 – WWII: The Bulgarian government is overthrown by the Fatherland Front coalition, which establishes a pro-Soviet government.
 September 10 – WWII: Liberation of Luxembourg.
 September 11 – WWII:
 The Laksevåg floating dry dock at Bergen (Norway) is sunk by British X-class submarine X-24.
 An approaching formation of 36 US bombers is engaged by a German fighter squadron (Jagdgeschwader) in the Battle over the Ore Mountains. After the first German attack on the bombers, US Mustangs attack the German squadron in aerial dogfights.
 September 12 – WWII: Allied forces from Operation Overlord (in northern France) and Operation Dragoon (in the south) link up near Dijon.
 September 13 – WWII: The Battle of Meligalas begins, between the Greek Resistance forces of the Greek People's Liberation Army (ELAS) and the collaborationist Security Battalions.
 September 14 – The Great Atlantic hurricane makes landfall in the New York City area.
 September 15 – WWII: The Battle of Peleliu begins in the Pacific.
 September 17 – WWII: Operation Market Garden: Allied airborne landings begin in the Netherlands and Germany.
 September 17–20 – WWII: Italian Campaign – In the Battle of San Marino, British and Empire forces take the occupied neutral republic of San Marino from the German Army.
 September 18 – WWII:
 British submarine  torpedoes Japanese "hell ship" ; 5,620 drown.
 After German forces declare the evacuation of Estonia the day before, the Estonian national government briefly resumes control of Tallinn before the Soviet advance.
 September 19 – WWII:
 An armistice between Finland and the Soviet Union is signed, ending the Continuation War.
 The Battle of Hürtgen Forest begins, east of the Belgian–German border.
 September 22 – WWII: The Red Army captures Tallinn, Estonia. Prime Minister in Duties of the President of Estonia Jüri Uluots and 80,000 Estonian civilians manage to escape to Sweden and Germany. The evacuees include almost the entire population of Estonian Swedes. Soviet bombing raids on the evacuating ships sink several, with thousands on board.
 September 24 – WWII: The U.S. 45th Infantry Division takes the strongly defended city of Épinal in France before crossing the Moselle River and entering the western foothills of the Vosges.
 September 26 – WWII:
 Operation Market Garden ends in an Allied withdrawal.
 On the middle front of the Gothic Line, Brazilian troops control the Serchio valley region after 10 days of fighting.

October

 October 2 – WWII: Nazi troops end the Warsaw Uprising. This is followed by the Destruction of Warsaw.
 October 4 – WWII: Milan Nedić's collaborationist puppet government of the Axis powers, the Government of National Salvation in Nazi-occupied Serbia, is disbanded.
 October 5 – WWII: Royal Canadian Air Force pilots shoot down the first German Me 262 over the Netherlands.
 October 6
 WWII: The Battle of Debrecen starts on the Eastern Front, lasting until October 29.
 Milan Nedić, president of the Serbian collaborationist puppet state of the Axis powers, the Government of National Salvation, flees from Belgrade in Nazi-occupied Serbia by air together with other Serbian collaborators and German officials, via Hungary to Austria.
 The Holocaust: Members of the Sonderkommando (Jewish work units) in Auschwitz concentration camp stage a revolt, killing 3 SS men before being massacred themselves.
 The Dumbarton Oaks Conference concludes.
 October 8 – The Adventures of Ozzie and Harriet radio show debuts in the United States.
 October 9 – WWII: Fourth Moscow Conference: British Prime Minister Winston Churchill and Soviet Premier Joseph Stalin begin a 9-day conference in Moscow, to discuss the future of Europe.
 October 10
 The Holocaust/Porajmos: 800 Romani children are systematically murdered at the Auschwitz concentration camp.
 WWII: 10/10 Air Raid: Allied forces inflict significant losses upon Imperial Japanese Navy ships moored in Naha Harbor, destroying much of the city of Naha, Okinawa as well..
 October 11 – The Tuvan People's Republic is annexed into the Soviet Union.
 October 12
 WWII: The Allies land in Athens.
 Canadian Arctic explorer Henry Larsen returns to Vancouver, becoming the first person successfully to navigate the Northwest Passage in both directions, in the Royal Canadian Mounted Police schooner . His westbound voyage is the first completed in a single season, and the first passage through the Prince of Wales Strait.
 October 13 – WWII:
 Riga, the capital of Latvia, is taken by the Red Army.
 The first V-2 rocket attack on Antwerp takes place.
 October 14 – WWII: German Field Marshal Erwin Rommel commits forced suicide rather than face public disgrace and execution for allegedly conspiring against Adolf Hitler.
 October 16 – WWII: American bombing of Salzburg destroys the dome of the city's cathedral and most of a Mozart family home.
 October 18 – WWII: The Volkssturm Nazi militia is founded, on Adolf Hitler's orders.
 October 19 – The Guatemalan Revolution begins with the overthrow of Federico Ponce Vaides by a popular leftist movement.
 October 20 – WWII:
 Belgrade Offensive ends when Belgrade is liberated by Yugoslav Partisans, together with the Bulgarian Army and the Red Army, and the remnants of Nedić's collaborationist Serbian puppet state, the Government of National Salvation, are abolished.
 American and Filipino troops (with Filipino guerrillas) begin the Battle of Leyte in the Philippines. American forces land on Red Beach in Palo, Leyte, as General Douglas MacArthur returns to the Philippines with Philippine Commonwealth president Sergio Osmeña and Armed Forces of the Philippines Generals Basilio J. Valdes and Carlos P. Romulo. American forces land on the beaches in Dulag, Leyte, accompanied by Filipino troops entering the town, and fiercely opposed by the Japanese occupation forces. The combined forces liberate Tacloban.
 Operation Pheasant begins – an offensive in the Netherlands which supports the ongoing Battle of the Scheldt.
 October 21 – WWII: Aachen, the first German city to fall, is captured by American troops.
 October 23–26 – WWII: Naval Battle of Leyte Gulf in the Philippines – In the largest naval battle in history by most criteria and the last naval battle in history between battleships, combined United States and Australian naval forces decisively defeat the Imperial Japanese Navy. This is the first battle in which Japanese aircraft carry out organized kamikaze attacks.
 October 24
 Battle of Leyte Gulf: The  is sunk by United States aircraft.
 The Allies recognise Charles de Gaulle's cabinet as the provisional government of France.
 October 25
 WWII: The Red Army liberates Kirkenes, the first town in Norway to be liberated.
 WWII:  is sunk in the Formosa Strait by one of her own torpedoes. Medal of Honor-winning submarine ace Richard O'Kane becomes a prisoner of war.
 76-year-old American amateur soprano Florence Foster Jenkins gives a sell-out public recital in Carnegie Hall, New York. The audience and press are scathing: "she can sing everything except notes". 5 days later she suffers a fatal heart attack, dying at home on November 26.
 October 27 – WWII: German forces capture Banská Bystrica, the center of anti-Nazi opposition in Slovakia, bringing the Slovak National Uprising to an end.
 October 30
 The Holocaust: Anne Frank and her sister Margot are deported from Auschwitz to the Bergen-Belsen concentration camp.
 Appalachian Spring, a ballet by Martha Graham with music by Aaron Copland, debuts at the Library of Congress in Washington, D.C., with Graham in the lead role.
 October 31 – Serial killer Dr Marcel Petiot is apprehended at a Paris Métro station after 7 months on the run.

November

 November 1–December 7 – Delegates of 52 nations meet at the International Civil Aviation Conference in Chicago, to plan for postwar international cooperation, framing the constitution of the International Civil Aviation Organization.
 November 3 – WWII: Two supreme commanders of the Slovak National Uprising, Generals Ján Golian and Rudolf Viest, are captured, tortured and later executed by German forces.
 November 7
 1944 United States presidential election: Franklin D. Roosevelt wins reelection over Republican challenger Thomas E. Dewey, becoming the only U.S. president elected to a fourth term.
 Election day rail accident in Puerto Rico: A passenger train derails at Aguadilla due to excessive speed on a downgrade; 16 are killed, 50 injured.
 November 10 – WWII: Ammunition ship  disintegrates from the accidental detonation of 3,800 tons of cargo, in the Seeadler Harbor fleet anchorage at Manus Island. 22 small boats are destroyed, 36 nearby ships damaged, 432 men are killed and 371 more are injured.
 November 11 – Operational ships of the French Navy re-enter their base at Toulon.
 November 12 – WWII: Operation Catechism –  is sunk by British Royal Air Force Lancaster bombers near Tromsø. Estimated casualties range from 950 to 1,204.
 November 14 – WWII:American submarine   torpedoes Japanese aircraft carrier Akitsu Maru in the East China Sea; 2,246 drown.
 November 16 – WWII: U.S. forces begin the month-long Operation Queen in the Rur Valley.
 November 18
 The Popular Socialist Youth is founded in Cuba.
 WWII: American submarine  torpedoes Japanese landing craft depot ship ; 3,546 drown.
 November 22
 Conscription Crisis: Prime Minister of Canada William Mackenzie King agrees a one-time conscription levy in Canada for overseas service.
 Laurence Olivier's film Henry V, based on Shakespeare's play, opens in London. It is the most acclaimed and the most successful movie version of a Shakespeare play made up to this time, and the first in Technicolor. Olivier both stars and directs.
 November 24 – WWII: German forces evacuate from the West Estonian Archipelago.
 November 27
The blast is one of the largest non-nuclear explosions in history, and the largest on UK soil.
 Operation Tigerfish: Royal Air Force bombing of Freiburg im Breisgau kills 2,800.
 November 29 – WWII: American submarine  sinks Japanese aircraft carrier Shinano, the largest carrier built to this date, and will remain through the twentieth century the largest ship sunk by a submarine.

December

 December 1 – Edward Stettinius, Jr. becomes the last United States Secretary of State of the Roosevelt administration, filling the seat left by Cordell Hull.
 December 3 – WWII:
 Fighting breaks out between Communists and royalists in newly liberated Greece, eventually leading to a full-scale Greek Civil War.
 The Home Guard (United Kingdom) is stood down.
 December 7
 The Convention on International Civil Aviation is signed in Chicago, creating the International Civil Aviation Organization.
 The Arab Women's Congress of 1944 is hosted by the Egyptian Feminist Union in Cairo, leading to establishment of the Arab Feminist Union.
 An earthquake along the coast of Wakayama Prefecture in Japan causes a tsunami which kills 1223 people.
 December 10 – Italian conductor Arturo Toscanini leads a concert performance of the first half of Beethoven's Fidelio (minus its spoken dialogue) on NBC Radio, starring Rose Bampton. He chooses this opera for its political message: a statement against tyranny and dictatorship. Presenting it in German, Toscanini intends it as a tribute to the German people who are being oppressed by Hitler. The second half is broadcast a week later. The performance is later released on LP and CD, the first of 7 operas that Toscanini conducts on radio.
 December 12–13 – WWII: British units attempt to take the Italian hilltop town of Tossignano, but are repulsed.
 December 13 – WWII: Battle of Mindoro – United States, Australian and Philippine Commonwealth troops land on Mindoro Island in the Philippines.
 December 14
 The Soviet government changes Turkish place names to Russian in the Crimea.
 The film National Velvet is released in the United States, bringing a young Elizabeth Taylor to stardom.
 December 15 – A USAAF utility aircraft carrying bandleader Major Glenn Miller disappears in heavy fog over the English Channel, while flying to Paris.
 December 16 – WWII:
 Germany begins the Ardennes offensive, later known as the Battle of the Bulge.
 General George C. Marshall becomes the first U.S. Five-Star General.
 December 17 – WWII:
 Malmedy massacre: German SS troops under Joachim Peiper machine gun American prisoners of war captured during the Battle of the Bulge near Malmedy, and elsewhere in Belgium.
 Bombing of Ulm: 707 people are killed and 25,000 left homeless.
 December 18 – General Douglas MacArthur becomes the second U.S. Five-Star General.
 December 19 – The daily newspaper Le Monde begins publication in Paris.
 December 20
 The United States Women Airforce Service Pilots are disbanded.
 General Dwight D. Eisenhower is promoted to the rank of 5-star U.S. Five-Star General.
 December 22
 WWII: Brigadier General Anthony C. McAuliffe, commander of the U.S. forces defending Bastogne, refuses to accept demands for surrender by sending a one-word reply, "Nuts!", to the German command.
 The Vietnam People's Army is formed in French Indochina.
 December 24
Approximately 763 soldiers of the U.S. 66th Infantry Division, bound for the Battle of the Bulge, drown.
 WWII: German tanks reach the furthest point of the Bulge at Celles.
 WWII: Fifty German V-1 flying bombs, air-launched from Heinkel He 111 bombers flying over the North Sea, target Manchester in England, killing 42 and injuring more than 100 in the Oldham area.
 WWII: Bande massacre: 34 men between the ages of 17 and 32 are executed by the Sicherheitsdienst near Bande, Belgium, in retaliation for the killing of 3 German soldiers.
 The first complete U.S. production of Tchaikovsky's ballet The Nutcracker is presented in San Francisco, choreographed by Willam Christensen. It will become an annual tradition there, and for the next ten years, the San Francisco Ballet will be the only company in the United States performing the complete work.
 December 24–26 – Agana race riot in Guam between white and black United States Marines.
 December 26
 WWII: American troops repulse German forces at Bastogne.
 The original stage version of The Glass Menagerie by Tennessee Williams premieres in Chicago.
 Esztergom, Hungary, is captured by the Russians.
 December 30
 King George II of Greece declares a regency, leaving his throne vacant.
 Stage Door Cartoon is the first cartoon produced by Eddie Selzer.
 December 31 – WWII: Battle of Leyte – Tens of thousands of Imperial Japanese Army soldiers are killed in action, in a significant Filipino/Allied military victory.

Date unknown
 The 1944 Summer Olympics, scheduled for London (together with the February Winter Olympics scheduled for Cortina d'Ampezzo in Italy), are suspended due to WWII.
 National Committee for Education on Alcoholism, predecessor of the National Council on Alcoholism and Drug Dependence, is established in the United States by Marty Mann.
 Last known evidence of the existence of the Asiatic lion in the wild in Khuzestan Province, Persia.
 The BC Žalgiris professional basketball club is founded in Kaunas, Lithuanian Soviet Socialist Republic.

Births

January

 January 1
 Omar al-Bashir, 7th President of Sudan
 Mohammad Abdul Hamid, President of Bangladesh
 Jumabek Ibraimov, 5th Prime Minister of Kyrgyzstan (d. 1999)
 Zafarullah Khan Jamali, Pakistani politician, 15th Prime Minister of Pakistan (d. 2020)
 Robert Lee Minor, American actor, stunt performer
 January 2 – Prince Norodom Ranariddh, Cambodian politician (d. 2021)
 January 3 – Chris von Saltza, American swimmer
 January 6
 Bonnie Franklin, American actress, singer, dancer and television director (d. 2013)
 Rolf M. Zinkernagel, Swiss immunologist, recipient of the Nobel Prize in Physiology or Medicine
 January 7 – Mike Hebert, American volleyball coach (d. 2019)
 January 8 – Terry Brooks, American fantasy fiction writer
 January 9
 Harun Farocki, German filmmaker, author and lecturer (d. 2014)
 Ian Hornak, American painter, draughtsman and sculptor (d. 2002)
 Jimmy Page, English rock guitarist (Led Zeppelin)
 January 10
 Rory Byrne, South African engineer and car designer
 William Sanderson, American actor
 Frank Sinatra Jr., American singer-songwriter and actor (d. 2016)
 January 12
 Joe Frazier, African-American boxer (d. 2011)
 Vlastimil Hort, Czechoslovak-born German chess Grandmaster
 Carlos Villagrán, Mexican actor and comedian
 Klaus Wedemeier, German politician
 January 17
 Jan Guillou, Swedish author
 Françoise Hardy, French singer
 January 18
 Paul Keating, 24th Prime Minister of Australia
 Alexander Van der Bellen, President of Austria
 January 19 – Shelley Fabares, American actress, singer
 January 20 – Isao Okano, Japanese judoka
 January 23
 Sergei Belov, Soviet basketball player (d. 2013)
 Rutger Hauer, Dutch actor, writer and environmentalist (d. 2019)
 January 24
 David Gerrold, American screenwriter and novelist
 Klaus Nomi, German singer (d. 1983)
 January 25
 Sally Beauman, English journalist and novelist (d. 2016)
 Evan Chandler, American screenwriter and dentist (suicide 2009)
 January 26
 Angela Davis, African-American political activist, academic and author
 Jerry Sandusky, American child molester, Penn State coach
 January 27
 Peter Akinola, Nigerian religious leader
 Mairead Maguire, Northern Irish peace activist, recipient of the Nobel Peace Prize
 Nick Mason, English rock drummer (Pink Floyd)
 January 28
 Susan Howard, American actress
 Rosalía Mera, Spanish fashion retailer (Zara) (d. 2013)
 John Tavener, English composer (d. 2013)
 January 29 – Susana Giménez, Argentinian television presenter
 January 31 – Connie Booth, American writer, actress

February

 February 2
 Geoffrey Hughes, English actor (d. 2012)
 Oqil Oqilov, Tajikistani politician, 7th Prime Minister of Tajikistan
 February 4
 Punch Gunalan, Malaysian badminton star (d. 2012)
 Maruja Carrasco, Spanish botanist and academic (d. 2018)
 February 5
 Al Kooper, American rock musician (Blood, Sweat & Tears)
 Thekla Carola Wied, German actress
 February 8
 Bunky Henry, American professional golfer (d. 2018)
 Roger Lloyd-Pack, English actor (d. 2014)
 February 9 – Alice Walker, African-American novelist, writer, poet and activist
 February 10
 Peter Allen, Australian-born Academy Award-winning composer and lyricist (d. 1992)
 Jean-Daniel Cadinot, French photographer, director and producer (d. 2008)
 February 11 – Michael G. Oxley, American politician (d. 2016)
 February 12 – Moe Bandy, American country music singer
 February 13
 Stockard Channing, American actress
 Michael Ensign, American actor
 Jerry Springer, English-born American politician and television personality
 February 14
 Carl Bernstein, American journalist
 Sir Alan Parker, English film director, producer, actor and writer (d. 2020)
 February 15
 Mick Avory, English rock drummer (The Kinks)
 Dzhokhar Dudayev, Chechen leader, first President of the Chechen Republic of Ichkeria (d. 1996)
 February 16
 Richard Ford, American fiction writer
 António Mascarenhas Monteiro, President of Cape Verde (d. 2016)
 February 17
 Karl Jenkins, Welsh composer
 Bernie Grant, British Labour Party MP (d. 2000)
 February 19 – Donald F. Glut, American writer, film director and screenwriter
 February 20
 Abdul Hamid Zainal Abidin, Malaysian politician and diplomat (d. 2014)
 Willem van Hanegem, Dutch footballer and coach
 February 22
 Jonathan Demme, American film director, producer and writer (d. 2017)
 Tom Okker, Dutch tennis player
 Robert Kardashian, American attorney and businessman (d. 2003)
 February 23 – Johnny Winter, American rock musician (d. 2014)
 February 24
 Ivica Račan, Croatian politician (d. 2007)
 David J. Wineland, American Nobel-laureate physicist
 February 25 – François Cevert, French racing driver (d. 1973)
 February 27
 Ken Grimwood, American fantasy fiction writer (d. 2003)
 Roger Scruton, English philosopher and writer (d. 2020)
 February 28
 Fanny Cano, Mexican actress and producer (d. 1983)
 Sepp Maier, German footballer
 February 29 – Dennis Farina, American actor (d. 2013)

March

 March 1
 John Breaux, American politician
 Roger Daltrey, English singer-songwriter (The Who), actor
 March 2
 Uschi Glas, German actress
 Leif Segerstam, Finnish conductor and composer
 March 3 – Odessa Cleveland, American actress (M*A*S*H)
 March 4
 Harvey Postlethwaite, English engineer and race car designer (d. 1999)
 Bobby Womack, African-American singer and songwriter (d. 2014)
 March 5 – Peter Brandes, Danish artist
 March 6
 Dame Kiri Te Kanawa, New Zealand soprano
 Mary Wilson, African-American singer (The Supremes) (d. 2021)
 March 7
 Michael Rosbash, American geneticist and chronobiologist, recipient of the Nobel Prize in Physiology or Medicine
 Townes Van Zandt, American country singer (d. 1997)
 March 8 – Buzz Hargrove, Canadian labour leader
 March 11
 Graham Lyle, Grammy-winning Scottish singer-songwriter and guitarist, known for writing several international hits for Tina Turner
 Don Maclean, English comedian and broadcaster
 March 15
 Emmerich Danzer, Austrian figure skater
 Ralph MacDonald, American percussionist, songwriter (d. 2011)
 March 17
 Pattie Boyd, English model and first wife of George Harrison and Eric Clapton
 John Sebastian, American singer-songwriter (The Lovin' Spoonful)
 March 18 – Dick Smith, Australian entrepreneur
 March 19
 Said Musa, Prime Minister of Belize
 Sirhan Sirhan, Palestinian assassin of Robert F. Kennedy
 March 20 – Erwin Neher, German biophysicist
 March 21 – Hilary Minster, English actor (d. 1999)
 March 23 – Ric Ocasek, American singer-songwriter and record producer (The Cars) (d. 2019)
 March 24 – R. Lee Ermey, American actor and Marine drill instructor (d. 2018)
 March 26 – Diana Ross, African-American actress and singer
 March 27 – Ann Sidney, Miss World
 March 28
 Rick Barry, American basketball player
 Ken Howard, American actor (d. 2016)
 March 29
 Nana Akufo-Addo, President of Ghana
 Denny McLain, American baseball player

April

 April 3 
 Grover Furr, American historical negationist and professor of English literature
 Tony Orlando, American pop singer-songwriter, producer and actor
 April 4
 Faisal bin Musaid, assassin and nephew of King Faisal of Saudi Arabia (d. 1975)
 Magda Aelvoet, Belgian politician
 Craig T. Nelson, American actor
 April 5 – Peter T. King, American politician
 April 6
 Judith McConnell, American actress
 Anita Pallenberg, Italian-born model and actress (d. 2017)
 Dame Felicity Palmer, English soprano
Charles Sobhraj, French-Indian serial killer
 April 7
 Shel Bachrach, American insurance broker, investor, businessman and philanthropist
 Warner Fusselle, American sportscaster (d. 2012)
 Makoto Kobayashi, Japanese physicist
 Oshik Levi, Israeli singer and actor
 Gerhard Schröder, Chancellor of Germany
 April 8
 Burny Bos, Dutch producer, scenarist and children's book writer.
 Odd Nerdrum, Norwegian painter
 Jimmy Walker, American professional basketball player (d. 2007)
 April 10 – Abubakar Habu Hashidu, Nigerian politician (d. 2018)
 April 11 – John Milius, American film director, producer and screenwriter
 April 13 – Jack Casady, American rock musician (Jefferson Airplane, Hot Tuna)
 April 14 – Nguyễn Phú Trọng, Vietnamese politician, General Secretary of the Communist Party and President
 April 15 – Kunishige Kamamoto, Japanese footballer, manager and politician
 April 18
 Isao Shibata, Japanese baseball player
 Charlie Tuna, American disc jockey and game show announcer (d. 2016)
 April 19
 Bernie Worrell, American keyboardist, composer (Parliament-Funkadelic) (d. 2016)
 James Heckman, American economist, Nobel Prize laureate
 April 20 – Thein Sein, Burmese politician, 8th President of Myanmar
 April 22 – Steve Fossett, American millionaire aviator, sailor and adventurer (d. 2007)
 April 24 – Tony Visconti, American record producer, musician and singer
 April 25 – Len Goodman, British ballroom dancer and television personality
 April 26
 Amien Rais, Indonesian politician
 Larry H. Miller, American sports owner (Utah Jazz; d. 2009)
 April 27
 Michael Fish, British TV weatherman
 Cuba Gooding Sr., American actor and singer (d. 2017)
 April 28 – Jean-Claude Van Cauwenberghe, Belgian politician
 April 29
 Princess Benedikte of Denmark
 Richard Kline, American actor and television director
 April 30
 Rudi Assauer, German footballer and manager (d. 2019)
 Jill Clayburgh, American actress (d. 2010)
 Michael Angelis, English actor (d. 2020)

May

 May 1
 Costa Cordalis, German singer (d. 2019)
 Suresh Kalmadi, Indian politician
 Marva Whitney, American singer (d. 2012)
 May 2 – Gloria Lizárraga de Capriles, Venezuelan politician (d. 2021)
May 4
 Walker Boone, Canadian actor (d. 2021)
 Russi Taylor, American actress (d. 2019)
 May 5
 Roger Rees, Welsh actor and director (d. 2015)
 John Rhys-Davies, Welsh actor
 May 8 – Gary Glitter (Paul Gadd), English glam rock singer and paedophile
 May 9
 Richie Furay, American rock singer-songwriter (Poco, Buffalo Springfield)
 Lars Norén, Swedish playwright, novelist and poet (d. 2021)
 Laurence Owen, American figure skater (d. 1961)
 May 10
 Jim Abrahams, American film director
 Jackie Lomax, English rock singer-songwriter, guitarist (d. 2013)
 May 12 – Sara Kestelman, English actress
 May 13
 Armistead Maupin, American fiction writer
 Carolyn Franklin, American soul singer-songwriter (d. 1988)
 May 14
 Connie Lawn, American journalist (d. 2018)
 George Lucas, American film director and producer
 May 15
 Ulrich Beck, German sociologist (d. 2015)
 Gunilla Hutton, Swedish-born American actress and singer
 May 16 – Danny Trejo, Hispanic-American actor
 May 17
 Luís de Matos Monteiro da Fonseca, Cape Verdean diplomat and civil servant
 Jesse Winchester, American-Canadian country singer-songwriter (d. 2014)
 May 19 
 Peter Mayhew, English-American actor (d. 2019)
 Jaan Talts, Estonian-Soviet weightlifter
 May 20
 Joe Cocker, English rock singer (d. 2014)
 Boudewijn de Groot, Batavian-born Dutch folk singer-songwriter
 Dietrich Mateschitz, Austrian businessman  (d. 2022)
 May 21 – Mary Robinson, President of Ireland
 May 22 – Roberto A. Abad, Filipino lawyer
 May 23
 John Newcombe, Australian tennis player
 Avraham Oz, Israeli theater professor, translator and political activist
 May 24
 Patti LaBelle, American singer, actress and entrepreneur
 David Mark Berger, Israeli weightlifter (d. 1972)
 May 25 – Frank Oz, English puppeteer and film director
 May 26 – Jan Schakowsky, U.S. Representative, Illinois's 9th congressional district
 May 27 – Chris Dodd, American politician
 May 28
 Rudy Giuliani, American politician, Mayor of New York City
 Gladys Knight, American singer
 Sondra Locke, American actress and director (d. 2018)
 Rita MacNeil, Canadian folk singer (d. 2013)
 Gary Stewart, American country rock singer-songwriter and musician (d. 2003)
 Patricia Quinn (Lady Stephens), Northern Irish actress
 May 29 – Helmut Berger, Austrian actor
 May 30 – Meredith MacRae, American actress (d. 2000)
 May 31 – Ayad Allawi, 38th Prime Minister of Iraq

June

 June 1
 Robert Powell, English actor
 Rafael Viñoly, Uruguayan-born architect (d. 2023)
 June 2
 Garo Yepremian, American football player (d. 2015)
 Marvin Hamlisch, American composer and conductor (d. 2012)
 June 3 – Edith McGuire, American sprinter
 June 4 – Michelle Phillips, American singer and actress
 June 5
 Colm Wilkinson, Irish actor and singer
 Whitfield Diffie, American cryptographer
 June 6
 Phillip Allen Sharp, American scientist, recipient of the Nobel Prize in Physiology or Medicine
 Edgar Froese, German electronic musician (d. 2015)
 Tommie Smith, American athlete
 June 7 – Annette Lu, Taiwanese politician, 8th Vice President of the Republic of China
 June 8
 Mark Belanger, American baseball player (d. 1998)
 Don Grady, American actor and singer (d. 2012)
 Marc Ouellet, Canadian cardinal
 Boz Scaggs, American singer and guitarist
 June 10 – Ze'ev Friedman, Israeli weightlifter (d. 1972)
 June 13 – Ban Ki-moon, South Korean politician and 8th Secretary-General of the United Nations
 June 15 – Malaysia Vasudevan, Tamil playback singer and actor (d. 2011)
 June 16 – Henri Richelet, French painter (d. 2020)
 June 17 – Bill Rafferty, American comedian and impressionist (d. 2012)
 June 18
 Salvador Sánchez Cerén, 45th President of El Salvador
 Rick Griffin, American graphic artist (d. 1991)
 Sandy Posey, American pop singer
 Bonar Sianturi, Indonesian army officer (d. 2022)
 June 19 – Chico Buarque, Brazilian singer-songwriter
 June 21
 Carmen Cardinali, Chilean professor, governor of Rapa Nui
 Franco Cordova, Italian international football player
 Corinna Tsopei, Greek actress, model and beauty queen, winner of Miss Universe 1964
 Sir Ray Davies, English rock singer-songwriter, co-founder of The Kinks
 Kenny O'Dell, American country singer-songwriter (d. 2018)
 Tony Scott, English film director (d. 2012)
 Luigi Sgarbozza, Italian road racing cyclist
 Chris Wood, English rock musician (Traffic) (d. 1983)
 June 22
 Ercole Gualazzini, Italian professional road bicycle racer
 Gérard Mourou, French electrical engineer, recipient of the Nobel Prize in Physics
 June 23
 Silvestre Bello III, Filipino businessman and lawyer
 Gan Ee Kiang, Malaysian pharmacologist
 June 24
 Jeff Beck, English rock musician (d. 2023)
 Dennis Butler, English footballer and football manager
 John "Charlie" Whitney, English guitarist
 June 25 – Ricardo Salgado, Portuguese economist and banker
 June 27
 Paul Koslo, German-Canadian actor (d. 2019)
 Zezé Motta, Brazilian actress and singer
 Patrick Sercu, Belgian cyclist (d. 2019)
 June 28 – Luis Nicolao, Argentine butterfly swimmer
 June 29
 Gary Busey, American actor
 Seán Patrick O'Malley, American cardinal
 June 30
 Daniel Kablan Duncan, Ivorian politician
 Terry Funk, American professional wrestler
 Raymond Moody, American parapsychologist
 Alan C. Fox, American author, philanthropist and entrepreneur
 Glenn Shorrock, English-born Australian rock singer-songwriter

July

 July 1
 Mercedes Bresso, Italian politician
 Mike Horan, Australian politician
 Nurul Haque Miah, Bangladeshi professor of chemistry and textbook writer (d. 2021)
 Diron Talbert, American football player
 Syd Jackson, Australian rules footballer
 July 2
 Billy Campbell, Northern Irish footballer
 Vicente de la Mata, Argentine football midfielder
 Paul Schudel, American football player and coach
 July 3 – Michel Polnareff, French singer
 July 4
 Joe Berardo, Portuguese businessman, investor and art collector
 Joe Critchlow, Canadian football player
 Albert Kapengut, Soviet chess master
 July 5
 Mick Andrews, English international motorcycle trials rider
 Hendrik Born, German vice admiral
 Enrique Irazoqui, Spanish movie actor
 July 6
 Tim Brown, Australian darts player
 Gunhild Hoffmeister, East German middle-distance runner
 Max Timisela, Indonesian footballer
 July 7
 Feri Cansel, Turkish-Cypriot actress (d. 1983)
 Nicholas, Crown Prince of Montenegro
 Mark Burgess, New Zealand cricketer
 Jürgen Grabowski, German footballer (d. 2022)
 Tony Jacklin, English golfer
 Feleti Sevele, Prime Minister of Tonga
 Michael Walker, Baron Walker of Aldringham, British Army officer
 July 8
Johanny "Jaimoe" Johanson, American drummer
 Jeffrey Tambor, American actor
William H. Pitsenbarger, United States Air Force Medal of Honour recipient (d. 1966)
 July 10 – Carlos Ruckauf, Argentine politician
 July 11
 Keith Doncon, Australian rules footballer
 Neil Vant, Canadian Anglican clergyman, prospector, businessman and political figure
 Valdeir Vieira, Brazilian football manager
 July 12
 Terry Cooper, English football player and manager
 July 13 – Ernő Rubik, Hungarian inventor
 July 16
 Clarence Parfitt, Bermudian and Scottish cricketer
 Jose L. Cuisia Jr., Philippine diplomat and banker
 July 17
 Mark Burgess, New Zealand cricket captain
 Catherine Schell, Hungarian actress
 Charles Lapointe, Canadian businessman, politician and public servant
 Tom Kalinske, American businessman
 Carlos Alberto Torres, Brazilian footballer (d. 2016)
 July 18 – David Hemery, British Olympic athlete
 July 20
 Mel Daniels, American basketball player and coach (d. 2015)
 W. Cary Edwards, American politician (d. 2010)
 July 21
 John Atta Mills, 13th President of Ghana (d. 2012)
 Paul Wellstone, U.S. Senator from Minnesota (d. 2002)
 July 26
 Celeste Yarnall, American actress (d. 2018)
 Kiel Martin, American actor (d. 1990)
 July 28 – Jozo Križanović, Bosnian politician (d. 2009)
 July 31
 Geraldine Chaplin, English-American actress
 Robert C. Merton, American economist, Nobel Prize laureate

August

 August 1
 Andrew G. Vajna, Hungarian-American film producer (d. 2019)
 Yury Romanenko, Soviet cosmonaut
 August 2
 Jim Capaldi, British drummer, singer and songwriter (d. 2005)
 Naná Vasconcelos, Brazilian percussionist and vocalist (d. 2016)
 August 3 – Jonas Falk, Swedish actor (d. 2010)
 August 4
 William Frankfather, American actor (d. 1998)
 Orhan Gencebay, Turkish musician, composer, singer and actor
 August 7
 John Glover, American actor
 Robert Mueller, American lawyer, FBI director
 August 8
 Michael Johnson, American singer-songwriter and guitarist (d. 2017)
 Hasyim Muzadi, Indonesian Islamic scholar (d. 2017)
 August 9 – Sam Elliott, American actor
 August 11
 Ian McDiarmid, Scottish actor
 Frederick W. Smith, American founder of FedEx
 August 12 – Larry Troutman, American funk musician (d. 1999)
 August 13 – Kevin Tighe, American actor
 August 15 – Sylvie Vartan, French singer
 August 18
 Robert Hitchcock, Australian sculptor
 Volker Lechtenbrink, German television actor and singer
 Helena Rojo, Mexican actress and model
 August 19
 Mordechai Spiegler, Israeli footballer and manager
 Charles Wang, Chinese-born American businessman, philanthropist and sports team owner (d. 2018)
 Bodil Malmsten, Swedish novelist and poet (d. 2016)
 August 20 – Rajiv Gandhi, Prime Minister of India (d. 1991)
 August 21
 Kari S. Tikka, Finnish Professor of Finance (d. 2006)
 Peter Weir, Australian film director
 August 22 – Ayşen Gruda, Turkish actress and comedian (d. 2019)
 August 23
 Saira Banu, Indian actress
 Roberto D'Aubuisson, Salvadorean Army officer and right-wing political leader (d. 1992)
 August 24 – Rocky Johnson, Canadian professional wrestler and father of Dwayne Johnson (d. 2020)
 August 25 – Christine Chubbuck, American television reporter (d. 1974)
 August 25
 Pat Martino, American jazz guitarist (d. 2021)
 Abdullah Tarmugi, Singaporean politician 
 August 26 – Prince Richard, Duke of Gloucester
 August 27 – G. W. Bailey, American actor
 August 30 – Tug McGraw, American baseball player (d. 2004)
 August 31
 Jos LeDuc, Canadian professional wrestler (d. 1999)
 Earnie Shavers, African-American professional wrestler

September

 September 1 – Leonard Slatkin, American conductor
 September 2 – Gilles Marchal, French singer-songwriter
 September 3 – Ty Warner, American businessman, inventor of Beanie Babies
 September 4 – Tony Atkinson, British economist (d. 2017)
 September 6
 Christian Boltanski, French artist
 Swoosie Kurtz, American actress
 September 7
 Abul Hayat, Bangladeshi actor
 Earl Manigault, American basketball player (d. 1998)
 Bora Milutinović, Serbian footballer and coach
 Sam Sloan, American chess player and autodidact
 September 11 – Serge Haroche, French physicist
 September 12
 Leonard Peltier, Native American activist and convicted murderer
 Barry White, African-American singer (d. 2003)
 September 13
 Carol Barnes, British newsreader (d. 2008)
 Jacqueline Bisset, English actress
 Peter Cetera, lead singer and guitarist of American rock group Chicago
 September 15
 Yoweri Museveni, Ugandan politician, 9th President of Uganda
 Graham Taylor, English footballer and football manager (d. 2017)
 September 16 – B.J. Ward, American voice actress
 September 17 – Reinhold Messner, Italian mountaineer
 September 18
 Veronica Carlson, English actress and model
 Satan's Angel, American exotic dancer
 September 19 – İsmet Özel, Turkish poet
 September 21
 Caleb Deschanel, American cinematographer and film director
 Hamilton Jordan, Jimmy Carter's first White House Chief of Staff (d. 2008)
 September 22 – Frazer Hines, British actor
 September 25 – Michael Douglas, American actor and producer
 September 26 – Anne Robinson, British television host
 September 27 – Angélica María, American-born Mexican singer-songwriter and actress
 September 28 – Miloš Zeman, 3rd President of the Czech Republic
 September 30 – Jimmy Johnstone, Scottish footballer (d. 2006)

October

 October 2 – Vernor Vinge, American science fiction writer
 October 4
 Rocío Dúrcal, Spanish singer and actress (d. 2006)
 Tony La Russa, American baseball player and manager
 October 5 – Arnhim Eustace, Vincentian politician and 3rd Prime Minister of Saint Vincent and the Grenadines
 October 6
 Dhammananda Bhikkhuni, born Chatsumarn Kabilsingh, pioneering female Thai Buddhist monk, previously academic
 Mylon LeFevre, American singer and evangelist
 October 7
 Sir Donald Tsang, 2nd Chief Executive of Hong Kong
 October 8 – Dale Dye, American actor, technical advisor, radio personality and writer
 October 9
 John Entwistle, English rock bass guitarist and singer-songwriter (The Who) (d. 2002)
 Nona Hendryx, American R&B singer (Labelle)
 Peter Tosh, Jamaican singer and musician (d. 1987)
 October 14 – Udo Kier, German actor
 October 15
 Mac Collins, American politician (d. 2018)
 Şerif Gören, Turkish film director
 Haim Saban, Israeli-American media proprietor
 David Trimble, Northern Irish Unionist political leader; recipient of the Nobel Peace Prize 1998 (d. 2022)
 October 16 – Elizabeth Loftus, American cognitive psychologist and memory specialist
 October 20 – Clive Hornby, English actor (d. 2008)
 October 21 – Jean-Pierre Sauvage, French scientist; recipient of the Nobel Prize in Chemistry 2016
 October 25
 Jon Anderson, English rock singer-songwriter and musician
 Ron Coote, Australian rugby league player
 Kati Kovács, Hungarian jazz, pop and rock musician
 Azizan Abdul Razak, Malaysian politician (d. 2013)
 October 27 – Nikolai Karachentsov, Russian actor (d. 2018)
 October 28
 Dennis Franz, American actor
 Marián Labuda, Slovak actor (d. 2018)
 Ian Marter, English actor and writer (d. 1986)
 October 30 – Ahmed Chalabi, Iraqi businessman and politician (d. 2015)
 October 31 – Hal Wick, American politician (d. 2018)

November

 November 1
 Kinky Friedman, American singer-songwriter, novelist, humorist, politician and columnist
 Rafic Hariri, 2-Time Prime Minister of Lebanon (d. 2005)
 Bobby Heenan, American professional wrestling manager and commentator (d. 2017)
 Oscar Temaru, President of French Polynesia
 November 2
 Michael Buffer, American ring announcer and actor
 Keith Emerson, English keyboardist (d. 2016)
 November 4 – Linda Gary, American actress (d. 1995)
 November 7 – Luigi Riva, Italian footballer
 November 10
 Askar Akayev, 1st President of Kyrgyzstan
 Silvestre Reyes, American politician
 Tim Rice, English lyricist, writer and broadcaster
 November 11 – Kemal Sunal, Turkish comedian
 November 12
 Booker T. Jones, American R&B singer-songwriter, musician and producer
 Al Michaels, American sportscaster
 November 17
 Jim Boeheim, American basketball player and coach
 Gene Clark, American singer-songwriter (d. 1991)
 Danny DeVito, American actor, film producer and director
 Gary Goldman, American animator, film producer and director
 Rem Koolhaas, Dutch architect
 Lorne Michaels, Canadian television and film producer
 Tom Seaver, American baseball pitcher (d. 2020)
 Sammy Younge Jr., American civil rights activist (d. 1966)
 November 18
 Wolfgang Joop, German artist, fashion designer and art collector
 Ed Krupp, American astronomer, director of the Griffith Observatory
 November 20  Louie Dampier, American basketball player
 November 21
 Dick Durbin, American politician
 Earl Monroe, American basketball player
 Harold Ramis, American actor, director and comedy writer (d. 2014)
 November 23 – Peter Lindbergh, German fashion photographer and film director (d. 2019)
 November 24
 Candy Darling, American actress (d. 1974)
 Ibrahim Gambari, Nigerian scholar and diplomat
 November 25
 Ben Stein, American law professor, actor and author
 Michael Kijana Wamalwa, Kenyan politician, 8th Vice President of Kenya
 November 30 – George Graham, Scottish football player and manager

December

 December 1 – John Densmore, drummer, member of The Doors.
 December 2
 Cathy Lee Crosby, American actress (That's Incredible!)
 Ibrahim Rugova, 1st President of Kosovo (d. 2006)
 December 3 – Ralph McTell, English folk singer-songwriter
 December 4 – Dennis Wilson, American pop singer-songwriter and drummer (d. 1983)
 December 5 – Jeroen Krabbé, Dutch actor and film director
 December 6
 Kit Culkin, American stage actor
 Ron Kenoly, American Christian leader
 Sutiyoso, Indonesian politician and general, governor of Jakarta
 Jonathan King, English music producer
 December 7
 Daniel Chorzempa, American organist
 Georges Coste, French rugby player and coach
 December 8 – Sharmila Tagore, Indian actress and model
 December 9
 Giacomo dalla Torre del Tempio di Sanguinetto, 80th Prince and Grand Master of the Sovereign Military Order of Malta (d. 2020)
 Tadashi Irie, Japanese yakuza boss
 Ki Longfellow, American novelist
 Neil Innes, English writer, comedian and musician (d. 2019)
 December 10 – Andris Bērziņš, 8th President of Latvia
 December 11
 Gianni Morandi, Italian singer
 Brenda Lee, American singer
 Lynda Day George, American actress
 Teri Garr, American actress
 December 12
 Diana Bracho, Mexican actress
 Kenneth Cranham, Scottish born actor
 Cara Duff-MacCormick, Canadian stage actress
 December 17 – Bernard Hill, British actor
 December 19
 Mitchell Feigenbaum, American mathematical physicist (d. 2019)
 María Martha Serra Lima, Argentine singer (d. 2017)
 Tim Reid, African-American actor and film director
 Terry Underwood, Australian author
 December 20 – Ray Martin, Australian journalist and television presenter
 December 21
 Bill Atkinson, English footballer
 Michael Tilson Thomas, American conductor
 Zheng Xiaoyu, Chinese bureaucrat (d. 2007)
 December 22 – Steve Carlton, American baseball player
 December 23
 Wesley Clark, U.S. general and NATO Supreme Allied Commander
 Ingar Knudtsen, Norwegian novelist and poet
 December 24 – Erhard Keller, German speed skater
 December 25
Jairzinho, Brazilian football player
 Kenny Everett, British comedian and radio DJ. (d. 1995)
 December 26
 Bill Ayers, American education theorist, previously radical anti-war activist
 Jane Lapotaire, British actress
 Aleksey Mikhalyov, Russian translator
 December 28
 Kary Mullis, American chemist, Nobel Prize laureate (d. 2019)
 Edgar Vivar, Mexican actor (Señor Barriga and Ñoño in El Chavo del Ocho)
 December 29 – King Birendra of Nepal (d. 2001)
 December 30 – Joseph Hilbe, American statistician and author
 December 31
 Neil Ross, British-American voice actor and announcer
 Jan Widströmer, Swedish painter and poet

Deaths

January

 January 1
 Sir Edwin Lutyens, British architect (b. 1869)
 Charles Turner, Australian cricketer (b. 1862)
 January 3 – Franz Reichleitner, Austrian SS officer and Nazi concentration camp commandant (b. 1906)
 January 4 – Kaj Munk, Danish playwright, Lutheran pastor and martyr (b. 1898)
 January 6 – Ida Tarbell, American journalist and muckraker (b. 1857)
 January 7 – Lou Henry Hoover, First Lady of the United States (b. 1874)
 January 9 – Antanas Smetona, President of Lithuania (b. 1874)
 January 10
 William Emerson Ritter, American biologist (b. 1856)
 Andrey Toshev, Bulgarian scientist and diplomat, 26th Prime Minister of Bulgaria (b. 1867)
 January 11
 Italian leaders of the Grand Council of Fascism executed following the Verona Trial
 Emilio De Bono, general (b. 1866)
 Galeazzo Ciano, aristocrat and diplomat (b. 1903)
 Giovanni Marinelli, politician (b. 1879)
 Charles King, American actor (b. 1889)
 Edgard Potier, Belgian spy (suicide) (b. 1903)
 January 12
 Nicholas Bunkerd Kitbamrung, Thai Roman Catholic priest and blessed (b. 1895)
 Juliette Atkinson, American tennis champion (b. 1873)
 January 13 – King Yuhi V of Rwanda (b. 1883)
 January 14 – Mehmet Emin Yurdakul, Turkish writer (b. 1869)
 January 18 – Léon Brunschvicg, French philosopher (b. 1869)
 January 20 – James McKeen Cattell, American psychologist (b. 1860)
 January 21 – Yoshimi Nishida, Japanese general (b. 1892)
 January 23 – Edvard Munch, Norwegian painter (b. 1863)
 January 25 – Teresa Grillo Michel, Italian Roman Catholic nun and blessed (b. 1855)
 January 29 – William Allen White, American journalist (b. 1868)
 January 31
 Jean Giraudoux, French writer (b. 1882)
 Árpád Weisz, Hungarian footballer (b. 1896)

February

 February 1 – Piet Mondrian, Dutch painter (b. 1872)
 February 3 – Yvette Guilbert, French singer and actress (b. 1867)
 February 7 – Robert E. Park, American sociologist (b. 1864)
 February 9 – Agnes Mary Frances Duclaux, British poet, essayist and novelist (b. 1857)
 February 11 – Carl Meinhof, German linguist (b. 1857)
 February 12
 Kenneth Gandar-Dower, English sportsman, aviator, explorer and author (b. 1908)
 Margaret Woodrow Wilson, American singer; Presidential daughter (b. 1886)
 February 13 – Edgar Selwyn, American screenwriter (b. 1875)
 February 16
 Carl August Ehrensvärd, Swedish admiral (b. 1858)
 Henri Nathansen, Danish writer and director (b. 1868)
 February 21 – Ferenc Szisz, Hungarian-born race car driver (b. 1873)
 February 23 – Leo Baekeland, Belgian-born American chemist (b. 1863)
 February 24 – Fanny Clar, French journalist and writer (b. 1875)
 February 29 – Pehr Evind Svinhufvud, Finnish politician, 1st Prime Minister and 3rd President of Finland (b. 1861)

March

March 3 – Paul-Émile Janson, Belgian politician, 30th Prime Minister of Belgium (b. 1872)
 March 4 – Louis Buchalter, Jewish-born American mobster, head of Murder, Inc. (executed) (b. 1897)
 March 5
Max Jacob, French poet (b. 1876)
Neel E. Kearby, American fighter ace (killed in action) (b. 1911)
March 8 - Xu Zonghan, Chinese medical doctor, politician and revolutionary (b. 1877)
 March 9 – Demetrios Capetanakis, Greek poet, essayist and critic (b. 1912)
 March 11
 Hendrik Willem van Loon, Dutch-born American historian, journalist and writer (b. 1882)
 Irvin S. Cobb, American writer (b. 1876)
 March 15
Otto von Below, German general (b. 1857)
Mariya Oktyabrskaya, Soviet national hero (b. 1905)
 March 17 – Mario Bravo, Argentinian politician and writer (b. 1882)
 March 19
 Giuseppe de Liguoro, Italian actor and director (b. 1869)
 Noël Édouard, vicomte de Curières de Castelnau, French general (b. 1851)
 March 22 – Pierre Brossolette, journalist and French Resistance fighter (b. 1903)
 March 23 – Myron Selznick, American film producer (b. 1898)
 March 24
 Aldo Finzi, Italian politician (executed) (b. 1891)
 Pietro Pappagallo, Italian Roman Catholic priest and blessed (b. 1888)
 Orde Wingate, British soldier (b. 1903)
 March 25 – Omelyan Kovch, Soviet Roman Catholic and Greek Orthodox priest, martyr and blessed (b. 1884)
 March 28 – Stephen Leacock, British-born Canadian humorist, author and economist (b. 1869)
 March 31
 Antoni Kiewnarski, Polish WWII hero (b. 1899)
 Mineichi Koga, Japanese admiral (b. 1885)
 Włodzimierz Kolanowski, Polish army officer (b. 1913)

April

 April 1 – Sharifzyan Kazanbaev, Soviet army officer (b. 1916)
 April 2 – John Batchelor, British missionary and reverend (b. 1855)
 April 9 – Yevgeniya Rudneva, Soviet WWII heroine (b. 1920)
 April 13 – Bartolomeo Gosio, Italian scientist (b. 1863)
 April 15 – Giovanni Gentile, Italian philosopher and Fascist politician (assassinated) (b. 1875)
 April 17 – J. T. Hearne, English cricketer (b. 1867)
 April 21 – Hans-Valentin Hube, German army general (b. 1890)
 April 24 – Charles Jordan, American magician (b. 1888)
 April 25 – George Herriman, American cartoonist (b. 1880)
 April 28
 Mohammed Alim Khan, Emir of Bukhara (b. 1880)
 Frank Knox, American Secretary of the Navy during WWII (b. 1874)
 April 29
 Billy Bitzer, American cinematographer (b. 1874)
 Bernardino Machado, Portuguese political figure, 2-time Prime Minister of Portugal and 2-time President of Portugal, leader of the World War I (b. 1851)
 April 30 – Paul Poiret, French couturier (b. 1879)

May

 May 5 – Bertha Benz, German automotive pioneer, wife and business partner of automobile inventor Karl Benz (b. 1849)
 May 7 – William Ledyard Rodgers, American admiral and military and naval historian (b. 1860)
 May 11 – Leon Kozłowski, Polish archaeologist and politician, 25th Prime Minister of Poland (b. 1892)
 May 12
 Max Brand, American author (b. 1892)
 Harold Lowe, British sailor, 5th officer of the RMS Titanic (b. 1882)
 Arthur Quiller-Couch, British writer and academic (b. 1863)
 Edel Quinn, Irish Roman Catholic laywoman, missionary and venerable (b. 1907)
 May 15 – Patriarch Sergius I (b. 1867)
 May 16
 George Ade, American author (b. 1866)
 Filip Mișea, Aromanian activist, physician and politician (b. 1873)
 May 17 – Milena Jesenská, Czechoslovakian journalist, writer, editor and translator (b. 1896)
 May 20
 Fraser Barron, New Zealand bomber pilot during WWII (b. 1921)
 Eugenio Colorni, Italian philosopher and activist (b. 1909)
 Vincent Rose, American musician and band leader (b. 1880)
 May 21
Edmund Mortimer, American actor and director (b. 1874)
Li Jiayu, Chinese general of the National Revolutionary Army (b. 1892)
 May 23 – Thomas Curtis, American Olympic athlete (b. 1873)
 May 24
 Inigo Campioni, Italian admiral (executed) (b. 1878)
 Matsuji Ijuin, Japanese admiral (b. 1893)
 Luigi Mascherpa, Italian admiral (b. 1893)
 Harold Bell Wright, American writer (b. 1872)
 May 25 – Clark Daniel Stearns, 9th Governor of American Samoa (b. 1870)
 May 30
 Patriarch Mesrob I Naroyan of Constantinople (b. 1875)
 Jessie Ralph, American actress (b. 1864)

June

 June 5 – Józef Beck, Polish statesman (b. 1894)
 June 6
 Joseph Campbell, Northern Irish poet and lyricist (b. 1879)
 Wilhelm Falley, German general (killed in action) (b. 1897)
 Don Pratt, American general (killed in action) (b. 1892)
 Ker-Xavier Roussel, French painter (b. 1867)
 June 12 – Erich Marcks, German general (b. 1891)
 June 14 – George Stinney, American executed minor (b. 1929)
 June 16
 Marc Bloch, French historian (b. 1886)
 Sir Prafulla Chandra Ray, Indian chemist (b. 1861)
 June 18 – Harry Fielding Reid, American geophysicist and seismologist (b. 1859)
 June 25
 Dénes Berinkey, 21st Prime Minister of Hungary (b. 1871)
 Lucha Reyes, Mexican singer (b. 1906)
 María Chinchilla Recinos, Guatemalan teacher (b. 1909)
 June 27 – Milan Hodža, Slovak politician, champion of regional integration in Europe (b. 1878)
 June 28 – Anton Breinl, Australian medical practitioner and researcher (b. 1880)

July

 July 1 – Carl Mayer, Austrian screenwriter (b. 1894)
 July 6
 Andrée Borrel, French World War II heroine (b. 1919)
 Vera Leigh, British World War II heroine (b. 1903)
 Chūichi Nagumo, Japanese admiral (b. 1887)
 Sonya Olschanezky, German World War II heroine (b. 1923)
 Diana Rowden, British World War II heroine (b. 1915)
 July 7 
 Georges Mandel, French politician and WWII hero (b. 1885)
 Leonie von Meusebach–Zesch, American dentist (b. 1882)
 July 8
 George B. Seitz, American director (b. 1888)
 Takeo Takagi, Japanese admiral (killed in action) (b. 1892)
 July 9
 Ingvar Fredrik Håkansson, Swedish pilot (b. 1920)
 Kent Rogers, American voice actor (b. 1923)
 July 12
 Jesus Baza Duenas, Guamese Roman Catholic priest, martyr and blessed (b. 1911)
 Theodore Roosevelt Jr., American political and business leader (b. 1887)
 July 14 – Asmahan, Syrian-born Egyptian singer (b.1912)
 July 15 – Joseph Sadi-Lecointe, French aviator (b. 1891)
 July 16 – Moncena Dunn, American inventor (b. 1867)
 July 17 – Tarsykiya Matskiv, Soviet Eastern Catholic religious sister and blessed (b. 1919)
 July 18
 Augusto De Angelis, Italian writer and journalist (b. 1888)
 George Holt, American actor and director (b. 1878)
 Rex Whistler, British artist (b. 1905)
 July 20
 Ludwig Beck, German general and Chief of the German General Staff (b. 1880)
 Heinz Brandt, German officer (b. 1907)
 Mildred Harris, American actress (b. 1901) 
 Günther Korten, German colonel-general, chief of staff of the Luftwaffe (b. 1898)
 Claus von Stauffenberg, German resistance leader (b. 1907)
 July 21
 Werner von Haeften, German resistance member (executed) (b. 1908)
 Albrecht Mertz von Quirnheim, German resistance leader (b. 1905)
 Hans-Ulrich von Oertzen, German resistance member (suicide) (b. 1915)
 Friedrich Olbricht, German resistance leader (b. 1888)
 Henning von Tresckow, German general and resistance leader (suicide) (b. 1901)
 July 23 – Eduard Wagner, German general and resistance member (suicide) (b. 1894)
 July 25
 Lesley J. McNair, American general (b. 1883)
 Jakob von Uexküll, Baltic German biologist (b. 1864)
 July 26
 Clóvis Beviláqua, Brazilian jurist, historian and journalist (b. 1859)
 Wessel Freytag von Loringhoven, German resistance member (suicide) (b. 1899)
 Takakazu Kinashi, Japanese army officer (b. 1902)
 Reza Shah, 20th Prime Minister of Iran and Shah of Iran (b. 1877)
 July 27 – Perry McGillivray, American Olympic swimmer (b. 1893)
 July 28 – Werner Schrader, German resistance member (suicide) (b. 1895)
 July 30
Nikolai Nikolaevich Polikarpov, Soviet aeronautical engineer and aircraft designer (b. 1892)
Lee Powell, American actor (b. 1908)
 July 31 – Antoine de Saint-Exupéry, French pilot and children's writer (b. 1900)

August

 August 1
 Jean Prévost, French writer and journalist, member of the Maquis (b. 1901)
 Manuel L. Quezon, Filipino statesman, soldier and politician, 2nd President of the Philippines (b. 1878)
 August 2 – Kakuji Kakuta, Japanese admiral (b. 1890)
 August 4 – Krzysztof Kamil Baczyński, Polish poet (b. 1921)
 August 5 – Jędrzej Moraczewski, Polish politician, 2nd Prime Minister of Poland (b. 1870)
 August 7 
 Agustín Barrios, Paraguayan guitarist and composer (b. 1885)
 Jadwiga Falkowska, Polish teacher and activist (b. 1889)
 August 8
 Robert Bernardis, German resistance fighter (executed) (b. 1908)
 Albrecht von Hagen, German resistance fighter (executed) (b. 1904)
 Paul von Hase, German general and resistance leader (executed) (b. 1885)
 Erich Hoepner, German colonel-general and resistance leader (executed) (b. 1886)
 Juliusz Kaden-Bandrowski, Polish journalist and novelist (b. 1885)
 Hellmuth Stieff, German resistance fighter (executed) (b. 1901)
 Michael Wittmann, German tank commander (killed in action) (b. 1914)
 Erwin von Witzleben, German field marshal and resistance leader (executed) (b. 1881)
 Peter Yorck von Wartenburg, German resistance fighter (executed) (b. 1904)
 August 9 – Felix Nussbaum, German painter (b. 1904)
 August 10
 Alfred Kranzfelder, German resistance fighter (b. 1908)
 Fritz-Dietlof von der Schulenburg, German resistance fighter (b. 1902)
 Berthold Schenk Graf von Stauffenberg, Nazi opponent and lawyer (b. 1905)
 Hans Albrecht, Hereditary Prince of Schleswig-Holstein (b. 1917)
 August 11
 Francesco Federico Falco, Italian doctor (b. 1866)
 Hideyoshi Obata, Japanese general (b. 1890)
 August 12
 Jose Garvida Flores, Filipino writer, poet and playwright (b. 1900)
 Joseph P. Kennedy Jr., American fighter pilot, oldest son of Joseph P. Kennedy (b. 1915)
 Suzanne Spaak, Belgian World War II heroine (b. 1905)
 August 15
 Egbert Hayessen, German resistance fighter (b. 1913)
 Hans Bernd von Haeften, German resistance fighter (b. 1905)
 Wolf-Heinrich Graf von Helldorff, German police chief and resistance fighter (b. 1896)
 August 17
 Franciszek Brodniewicz, Polish actor (b. 1892)
 Eugénio de Castro, Portuguese poet and writer (b. 1869)
 August 18
 Eugeniusz Horbaczewski, Polish pilot (b. 1917)
 Ernst Thälmann, German Communist leader (executed) (b. 1886)
 August 19
 Günther von Kluge, German field marshal (suicide) (b. 1882)
 Sir Henry Wood, British conductor (b. 1869)
 August 21
 Friedrich Gustav Jaeger, German resistance fighter (b. 1895)
 Maciej Kalenkiewicz, Polish engineer and military officer (b. 1906)
 Marian Lalewicz, Polish architect (b. 1876)
 August 23
 Aleksander Augustynowicz, Polish painter (b. 1865)
 Abdülmecid II, last Caliph of the Ottoman Empire (b. 1868)
 Nikolai Roslavets, Soviet composer (b. 1880)
 August 24 – Carlo Emanuele Buscaglia, Italian aviator (b. 1915)
 August 25 – Teresio Vittorio Martinoli, Italian pilot (b. 1917)
 August 26
 Hans Georg Klamroth, German resistance fighter (executed) (b. 1898)
 Otto Kiep, German resistance fighter (b. 1886)
 Hans Leesment, Estonian general (b. 1873)
 Ludwig Freiherr von Leonrod, German resistance fighter (executed) (b. 1906)
 Adam von Trott zu Solz, German diplomat and resistance fighter (executed) (b. 1909)
 August 27
 Carlo Fecia di Cossato, Italian navy officer (b. 1908)
 Princess Mafalda of Savoy (b. 1902)
 August 28
 Teresa Bracco, Italian Roman Catholic religious sister and blessed (killed in battle) (b. 1924)
 Rudolf Breitscheid, German politician (b. 1874)
 Bronislaw Kaminski, Polish army officer (b. 1899)
 August 30
 Moissaye Boguslawski, American pianist and composer (b. 1887)
 Eberhard Finckh, German resistance fighter (b. 1899)
 Hans Otfried von Linstow, German resistance fighter (b. 1899)
 Carl-Heinrich von Stülpnagel, German general and resistance leader (b. 1886)

September

 September 1 – Krystyna Dąbrowska, Polish sculptor and painter (b. 1906)
 September 2 – Maria Vetulani de Nisau, Polish soldier (b. 1898)
September 3 - Friedrich Alpers, German Nazi politician and general (b. 1901)
 September 4
 Erich Fellgiebel, German general and resistance fighter (b. 1886)
 Heinrich Graf von Lehndorff-Steinort, German resistance fighter (b. 1909)
 Fritz Thiele, German general and resistance fighter (b. 1894)
 September 5 – Gustave Biéler, Swiss WWII hero (b. 1904)
 September 6 – Jan Franciszek Czartoryski, Polish Dominican friar, martyr and blessed (b. 1897)
 September 7 – Eduardo Sánchez de Fuentes, Cuban composer (b. 1897)
 September 8
 Georg Hansen, German resistance fighter (b. 1904)
 Ulrich von Hassell,  German diplomat and resistance fighter (b. 1881)
 Paul Lejeune-Jung, German resistance fighter (b. 1882)
 Ulrich Wilhelm Graf Schwerin von Schwanenfeld, German resistance fighter (b. 1902)
 Günther Smend, German resistance fighter (b. 1912)
 Josef Wirmer, German resistance fighter (b. 1901)
 September 9 – Robert Benoist, French race car driver and war hero (b. 1895)
 September 11 – Joseph Müller, German Roman Catholic priest and Servant of God (executed) (b. 1894)
 September 12 – Robert Fiske, American actor (b. 1889)
 September 13
 Grigore Bălan, Romanian general (died of wounds) (b. 1896)
 Yolande Beekman, French WWII heroine (executed) (b. 1911)
 Madeleine Damerment, French WWII heroine (executed) (b. 1917)
 Noor Inayat Khan, Indian WWII heroine (executed) (b. 1914)
 Eliane Plewman, British WWII heroine (executed) (b. 1917)
 W. Heath Robinson, British cartoonist and illustrator (b. 1872)
 September 14
 Heinrich Graf zu Dohna-Schlobitten, German resistance fighter (executed) (b. 1882)
 John Kenneth Macalister, Canadian WWII hero (b. 1914)
 Michael Graf von Matuschka, German resistance fighter (executed) (b. 1888)
 Frank Pickersgill, Canadian WWII hero (b. 1915)
 Roméo Sabourin, Canadian WWII hero (b. 1923)
 Nikolaus von Üxküll-Gyllenband, German resistance fighter (executed) (b. 1877)
 Hermann Josef Wehrle, German Catholic priest and resistance member (executed) (b. 1899)
 September 16 – Gustav Bauer, 11th Chancellor of Germany (b. 1870)
 September 18
 Hendrikus Colijn, Dutch policeman, politician and businessman, 25th Prime Minister of the Netherlands (b. 1869)
 Anton Saefkow, German communist (executed) (b. 1903)
 September 22 – Fritz Lindemann, German army officer (died of wounds) (b. 1894)
 September 23 – Matylda Palfyova, Czechoslovakian artistic gymnast (b. 1912)
 September 25
 Walter Breisky, Austrian civil servant, acting Chancellor of Austria (b. 1871)
 Eugeniusz Lokajski, Polish athlete, gymnast and photographer (b. 1909)
 Leo Chiozza Money, Italian-British economist and politician (b. 1870)
 September 27
 Aimee Semple McPherson, Canadian-American Pentecostal evangelist (b. 1890)
 Aristide Maillol, French sculptor and painter (b. 1861)
 David Dougal Williams, British painter (b. 1888)
 September 28 – Josef Bürckel, German Nazi gauleiter (b. 1895)
 September 29
 Otto Herfurth, German general and resistance fighter (b. 1893)
 Wilhelm Leuschner German politician and resistance fighter (b. 1890)
 Joachim Meichssner, German resistance fighter (b. 1906)
 Joachim Sadrozinski, German resistance fighter (b. 1907)

October

 October 1
 Sir William Mulock, Canadian lawyer, politician and businessman (b. 1843)
 Rudolf Schmundt, German general (b. 1896)
 October 2
 Benjamin Fondane, Romanian-French Symbolist poet, critic and existentialist philosopher (gassed in Auschwitz concentration camp) (b. 1898)
 Julián Felipe, Filipino musician and bandleader (b. 1861)
 Maeda Toshisada, Japanese politician (b. 1874)
 October 4 – Al Smith, American politician (b. 1873)
 October 5 – Prince Gustav of Denmark (b. 1887)
 October 8 – Wendell Willkie, American politician (b. 1892)
 October 9
 Kitty Marion, German-born actress and women's rights activist in England and the United States (b. 1871)
 Stefanina Moro, Italian resistance member (b. 1927)
 October 12
 Ramón Castillo, Argentinian politician, 25th President of Argentina (b. 1873)
 Carl Langbehn, German resistance member (b. 1901)
 Rudolf von Marogna-Redwitz, German resistance member (b. 1886)
 October 13
 Hans-Jürgen von Blumenthal, German resistance member (b. 1907)
 Roland von Hößlin, German resistance member (b. 1915)
 October 14 – Erwin Rommel, German field marshal (b. 1891)
 October 17 – Anton Hafner, German aviator (b. 1918)
 October 18
 Alexander, Prince of Erbach-Schönberg (b. 1872)
 Josef Maria Eder, Austrian chemist (b. 1855)
 October 19
 Isadore Bernstein, American screenwriter (b. 1876)
 Deneys Reitz, South African soldier and diplomat (b. 1882)
 October 20
 Eduard Brücklmeier, German diplomat and resistance member (b. 1903)
 Hermann Maaß, German politician and resistance member (b. 1897)
 Adolf Reichwein, German politician and resistance member (b. 1898)
 October 21 
 Nell Brinkley, American illustrator and comic artist (b. 1886)
 Hilma af Klint, Swedish abstract painter (b. 1862)
 October 22 – Richard Bennett, American actor (b. 1870)
 October 23 – Charles Glover Barkla, British physicist, Nobel Prize laureate (b. 1877)
 October 24
 Louis Renault, French industrialist, founder of Renault (b. 1877)
 Karl Freiherr von Thüngen, German general and resistance member (executed) (b. 1893)
 October 25 
 Shōji Nishimura, Japanese vice admiral (b. 1889)
 José de la Riva-Agüero y Osma, Peruvian historian, writer and politician, 84th Prime Minister of Peru (b. 1885)
 Yukio Seki, Japanese kamikaze pilot (b. 1921)
 October 26
 Princess Beatrice of the United Kingdom, youngest and last surviving child of Queen Victoria (b. 1857)
 Hiroyoshi Nishizawa, Japanese fighter ace (b. 1920)
 William Temple, Archbishop of Canterbury (b. 1881)
 October 27 – Judith Auer, German World War II resistance fighter (b. 1905)
 October 31
  Henrietta Crosman, American actress (b. 1861)
 Joseph Hubert Priestley, British botanist (b. 1883)

November

 November 1
 Ismael Pérez Pazmiño, Ecuadoran journalist and politician (b. 1876)
 Andrey Sheptytsky, Soviet Eastern Catholic archbishop and venerable (b. 1865)
 November 2
 Karol Irzykowski, Polish writer (b. 1873)
 Thomas Midgley Jr., American chemist and inventor (b. 1889)
 November 4 – Sir John Dill, British field marshal (b. 1881)
 November 5 – Alexis Carrel, French surgeon and biologist, recipient of the Nobel Prize in Physiology or Medicine (b. 1873)
 November 7
 Max Bergmann, German biochemist (b. 1886)
 Richard Sorge, Soviet spy, executed (b. 1895)
 Hannah Szenes, Hungarian World War II heroine, poet, executed (b. 1921)
 November 10
 Wang Jingwei, Chinese statesman, President of the Nanjing-based and Japanese-supported collaborationist Government of the Republic of China (b. 1883)
 Friedrich-Werner Graf von der Schulenburg, German diplomat and resistance member (b. 1875)
 November 12
 George David Birkhoff, American mathematician (b. 1884)
 George Houston, American actor (b. 1896)
 Otto Frank, German physiologist (b. 1865)
 November 13
 Carl Lampert, Austrian Roman Catholic priest and blessed (b. 1894)
 Friedrich Lorenz, German Roman Catholic priest and blessed (b. 1897)
 November 14
 Walter Cramer, German resistance member (b. 1886)
 Trafford Leigh-Mallory, British aviator and Royal Air Force Air Chief Marshal (b. 1892)
 Bernhard Letterhaus, German trade unionist and resistance member (b. 1894)
 Ferdinand von Lüninck, German politician and resistance member (b. 1888)
 November 16 – Maria Rodziewiczówna, Polish writer (b. 1863)
 November 19 – Ignacio Bolívar, Spanish naturalist and entomologist (b. 1850)
 November 22
 Joseph Caillaux, French politician, 57th Prime Minister of France (b. 1863)
 Sir Arthur Eddington, British astronomer, physicist and mathematician (b. 1882)
 Sadakichi Hartmann, Japanese-born American critic and poet (b. 1867)
 Johan Pitka, Estonian entrepreneur, sea captain and admiral (b. 1872)
 November 25 – Kenesaw Mountain Landis, 1st commissioner of Major League Baseball (b. 1866)
 November 26 – Florence Foster Jenkins, American socialite and singer (b. 1868)
 November 30 – Lilo Gloeden, German resistance member (b. 1903)

December

 December 1 – Franciszek Pius Radziwiłł, Polish nobleman and activist (b. 1878)
 December 2
 Filippo Tommaso Marinetti, Italian poet, editor and art theorist, founder of the Futurist movement (b. 1876)
 Josef Lhévinne, Soviet pianist (b. 1874)
 December 3 – Prince Andrew of Greece and Denmark (b. 1882)
 December 4 – Roger Bresnahan, American baseball player and member of the MLB Hall of Fame (b. 1879)
 December 9 – Laird Cregar, American actor (b. 1913)
 December 11 – Montgomery Cunningham Meigs, American WWII hero (b. 1919)
 December 12 – Bernard Chrzanowski, Polish activist (b. 1861)
 December 13 – Wassily Kandinsky, Russian-born Polish artist (b. 1866)
 December 14 – Lupe Vélez, Mexican actress, dancer and singer (b. 1908)
 December 15 – Glenn Miller, American band leader (accident) (b. 1904)
 December 19 – King Abbas II of Egypt (b. 1874)
 December 20
 Caesar von Hofacker, German resistance member (b. 1896)
 Carl Wentzel, German resistance member (b. 1875)
 December 22 – Harry Langdon, American comedian (b. 1884)
 December 26 – George Bellamy, British actor (b. 1866)
 December 27
 Amy Beach, American pianist and composer (b. 1867)
 Peter Deunov, Bulgarian spiritual teacher (b. 1864)
 Sára Salkaházi, Hungarian Roman Catholic religious sister and blessed (b. 1899)
 December 30 – Romain Rolland, French writer, Nobel Prize laureate (b. 1866)
 December 31
Vicente Lim, Filipino general of the Armed Forces of the Philippines (b. 1888)
Ruth Hanna McCormick, American politician, activist and publisher (b. 1880)

Nobel Prizes

 Physics – Isidor Isaac Rabi
 Chemistry – Otto Hahn
 Medicine – Joseph Erlanger, Herbert Spencer Gasser
 Literature – Johannes V. Jensen
 Peace – International Committee of the Red Cross

References

 
Leap years in the Gregorian calendar